Anostoma baileyi is a species of air-breathing land snail, a terrestrial pulmonate gastropod mollusc in the family Odontostomidae.

Distribution
This species occurs in Brazil.

Shell description
The shell has 5-5.25 whorls.

The width of adult shells is 29.6-32.3 mm, the height is 15.1-17.2 mm.

The main differences between the shell of this species and the similar shell of Anostoma rossi are that this shell has no spiral sculpture and the aperture is more elongated.

References

Odontostomidae
Gastropods described in 1956